Maurice Alexander Hintze was a male athlete who competed for England.

Athletics career
He competed in the 220 yards at the 1934 British Empire Games in London.

References

English male sprinters
Athletes (track and field) at the 1934 British Empire Games
Commonwealth Games competitors for England